Guba  (Cyrillic: Губа) is a gender-neutral Slavic surname. Notable people with the surname include:

Danny Guba (born 1952), Filipino martial artist
 Dávid Guba (born 1991), Slovak football player
Paulina Guba (born 1991), Polish shot putter

See also
Huba (surname)